Thomas Sleeman (1813–1896) was Archdeacon of Gibraltar from 1864 to 1869.

Sleeman was ordained in 1850. He was the Incumbent at St Andrew, South Tawton,  before his time as Archdeacon; and Chaplain at Darmstadt afterwards. He died on 9 November 1896.

References

1813 births
1896 deaths
19th-century Anglican priests
Archdeacons of Gibraltar